Willow Brook is an unincorporated community in Buchanan County, in the U.S. state of Missouri.

History
A post office called Willow Brook was established in 1878, and remained in operation until 1911. The community was named for the willow timber along a nearby creek.

References

Unincorporated communities in Buchanan County, Missouri
Unincorporated communities in Missouri